Emerald Lake is a freshwater lake located in Yoho National Park, British Columbia, Canada. Yoho National Park is one of the 4 contiguous National Parks in the heart of Canada's Rocky Mountains, along the boundary of British Columbia and Alberta Provinces, the other Parks are Kootenay, Jasper, and Banff.

Nearby features
Emerald Lake Lodge, a high-end lodge or hotel, is on a peninsula jutting into the lake. It was founded in the 1920s and completely rebuilt in the 1980s.  A quiet 2 lane paved road about 15 km / 9 miles long connects the busy Trans-Canada Highway with Emerald Lake, the exit is well marked.  A  hiking trail circuits the lake, the first half of which is accessible to wheelchairs and strollers, many other more advanced hiking trails go in different directions up into the mountains.

The railway and timber town of Golden BC is the nearest town to Emerald Lake that is outside the Park boundaries, it is about 50 km / 30 miles distant to the west in the low valley of the Columbia River headwaters, and has many lodging options, the small historic railway village of Field is in Yoho Park near the highway exit to Emerald Lake, and has a large Park-operated Information and Visitor's Center, Field Village also has gas, food and a few B & B's.  The Park Service Center of Lake Louise, which has limited lodging, is about 30 km / 20 miles to the east of Emerald Lake in neighboring Banff National Park, while the famous resort town of Banff, located on the southeast edge of that Park, is about 60 km / 40 miles further east of Lake Louise, it has a large number of hotels as does the town of Canmore, located just outside the Banff Park boundary. Vehicle / RV campgrounds are common throughout the region for summer use, reservations made well in advance are highly advised for hotels and campgrounds during summer, which is early June to late September on an average weather year.

Wildlife
Many wild animals live in the area and are protected by Park Law, Brown (Grizzly) Bears and Black Bears are fairly common, they co-exist quite well with humans as the Park has strict laws on garbage control and good advice to Park Visitors on practicing bear safety and being "Bear Aware".  Mountain Goats and Bighorn Sheep are seen at higher altitudes, and many smaller mammals are common everywhere.  Hunting is strictly prohibited in the Park, fishing is permitted with a Park license.

Surrounding geographical features
Emerald Lake is enclosed by mountains of the President Range, named after the President and Vice-President of the coast to coast Canadian Pacific Railway, built in 1885 and which runs through Yoho National Park.  Other peaks are Mount Burgess and Wapta Mountain.  The Emerald Basin opens to the west and traps rain and snow storms, causing frequent rain in summer and heavy snowfalls in winter.  This influx of moisture works with the lake's elevation of 1200 meters / 4400 feet above sea level to produce a unique selection of flora. Trees found here are more typical of B.C.'s wet interior forests of the Columbia Mountains immediately to the west, such as western red cedar, western yew, western hemlock and western white pine.  The alluvial fan on the northeast shore produces wildflowers in abundance during late June and early July.

Climate
Brief snowstorms, which usually melt in a few days, occasionally occur at valley level in June or September due to the latitude of 53 degrees and the generally high elevation.  Daytime temperatures in June or September average 20 C / 70 F, in July and August it can reach as high as 33 C / 90 F.  Winter temperatures December to March are always below freezing, averaging -15 C / 0 F and sometimes down to -30 C / -30 F.  Snowfall is usually substantial, about 1 meter / 3 feet or more of snow stays at lake level in winter, increasing with altitude to 10 meters / 30 feet or more on the mountain tops.

Due to its 53 degree latitude and moderately high altitude, the lake is frozen from November until late April or early May. The vivid green color of the water is caused by powdered rock from the glaciers which reflects the blue-green spectrum of sunlight, the rock type and the amount of it in the water causes the color to vary from lake to lake and month to month, even week to week.

Human interaction

Naming
The first non-indigenous person to set sight on Emerald Lake was Canadian guide Tom Wilson, who stumbled upon it by accident in 1882.  A string of his horses had gotten away, and it was while tracking them that he first entered the valley.  The lake had an impression on him: "For a few moments I sat [on] my horse and enjoyed the rare, peaceful beauty of the scene."  It was Wilson who gave the lake its name because of its remarkable color, which due to a different rock type producing the sediment that is  suspended in the glacial water, reflects the green spectrum of sunlight rather than the blue spectrum seen in Moraine, Hector, Bow and Peyto Lakes in neighboring Banff National Park. However, this was not the first time Wilson had named a lake 'Emerald'. Earlier that same year he had discovered another lake which he had given the same name, and that name even appeared briefly on the official map.  This first lake however, was shortly renamed Lake Louise.

Restrictions
During the summer months, canoe rentals are available from the Lodge, in the winter, the lake is a popular cross country skiing destination.  Canada's National Parks do not permit private or business land ownership within their boundaries, all development is strictly controlled by the National Park for environmental preservation, development permits are rarely if ever given, and then only after extensive government review and consultation, the land the business occupies is leased from the Park, nearly all businesses in the Parks were established decades ago, and current approval is exceedingly rare.  There is a strict "need-to-reside" law in place for living in a Canadian Mountain National Park town or village.

Gallery

See also 
List of lakes in Yoho National Park

References

External links

Canadian Rockies
Lakes of British Columbia
Yoho National Park
Kootenay Land District